CB Bears is an American animated television series produced by Hanna-Barbera Productions which aired on NBC from September 10 to December 3, 1977.

As with many Hanna-Barbera shows of the time, CB Bears was an anthology series with six regular segments: The CB Bears; Blast-Off Buzzard; Heyyy, It's the King; Posse Impossible; Shake, Rattle & Roll; and Undercover Elephant. Each segment riffed on a popular television show or film.

The CB Bears segment was a spoof on the 1976 hit show Charlie's Angels, with a trio of ursine investigators given assignments by an unseen dispatcher. Similarly, Heyyy, It's the King was a takeoff on the 1974 hit Happy Days, with a royal lion based on Henry Winkler's famous Fonzie. Blast-Off Buzzard imitated Looney Tunes' Wile E. Coyote and the Road Runner; Posse Impossible was a cowboy show caricaturing John Wayne; Shake, Rattle & Roll featured a trio of ghosts imitating comics Hugh Herbert, Lou Costello and Marty Allen; and Undercover Elephant spoofed Mission: Impossible.

On February 4, 1978, NBC repackaged the show as part of the two-hour The Go-Go Globetrotters, which also featured reruns of the Harlem Globetrotters series. This lasted until September 3.

Syndication
In syndication, CB Bears was shown in a shortened half-hour format with Blast-Off Buzzard and Posse Impossible; Heyyy, It's the King! was also shown in a shortened half-hour format with Shake, Rattle & Roll and Undercover Elephant. The show was also rebroadcast on Cartoon Network from 1995 to 1997. The CB Bears theme is also heard in the ending credits of The Skatebirds on CBS and Captain Caveman and the Teen Angels on ABC.

Segments

The CB Bears
Hustle (voiced by Daws Butler impersonating Phil Silvers), Boogie (voiced by Chuck McCann) and Bump (voiced by Henry Corden) are a trio of anthropomorphic bear detectives disguised as trash collectors. They travel the country solving mysteries in a tacky garbage truck called the Perfume Wagon (the CB term for a garbage truck). A sultry-voiced female named Charlie (voiced by Susan Davis) contacts the bears on the truck's CB radio to give them their assignments. This show was "inspired" by the hit TV series Charlie's Angels (Bump wore a blonde hairstyle similar to Farrah Fawcett). Each of the bears' names are based on a 1970s disco dance, and the show's overall premise made reference to the CB radio craze of the mid-1970s (by this point waning in popularity). Physically and personality-wise, Hustle, Boogie, and Bump resemble Hair Bear, Bubi Bear, and Square Bear, respectively, from the earlier cartoon Help!... It's the Hair Bear Bunch!; Daws Butler provided the same Phil Silvers-esque voice for both Hustle and Hair.

Episodes

Blast-Off Buzzard
Blast-Off Buzzard (vocal effects provided by Daws Butler) is a buzzard in aviator gear and a de facto villain who chases Crazylegs, a wacky football helmet-wearing snake who outruns the buzzard. Their situation was very similar to Wile E. Coyote and the Road Runner. This is a non-speaking segment.

Episodes

Heyyy, It's the King!
A cool, Fonzie-patterned lion named King (voiced by Lennie Weinrib) alongside his high school classmates Big H the Hippopotamus (voiced by Sheldon Allman), Clyde the Gorilla (voiced by Don Messick), Skids the Alligator (voiced by Marvin Kaplan), Yuka Yuka the Hyena (voiced by Lennie Weinrib), and cheerleaders Sheena the Lioness (voiced by Ginny McSwain) and Zelda the Ostrich (voiced by Susan Silo) attempt schemes to get into the spotlight.

Episodes

Posse Impossible
The Sheriff of Saddlesore (voiced by Bill Woodson) and his hopeless posse of cowboys: Stick (voiced by Daws Butler in a hillbilly voice), Big Duke (voiced by Daws Butler impersonating John Wayne) and Blubber (voiced by Chuck McCann) jail notorious outlaws by out-bungling the rascals. In every segment, the Sheriff goes after some no-good polecat which ends with the bad guys behind bars.

A prototype version of the posse was featured in the final episode of Hong Kong Phooey.

Episodes

Shake, Rattle & Roll
Shake (voiced by Paul Winchell), Rattle (voiced by Lennie Weinrib), and Roll (voiced by Joe E. Ross) are three ghosts who run the Haunted Inn, a hotel for ghosts and other supernatural creatures as they tend to their needs. Their workplace hijinks are sometimes disrupted by self-proclaimed "ghost exterminator" and nemesis Sidney Merciless (voiced by Alan Oppenheimer) who wants to rid the world of ghosts. Shake, Rattle, and Roll also tend to have problems with the Ghost Mouse as their Poltercat helps in attempts to get rid of it.

Episodes

Undercover Elephant
Undercover Elephant (voiced by Daws Butler) and his sidekick Loudmouse the Mouse (voiced by Bob Hastings) work for Central Control and solve mysteries. Recurring gags of this segment included disguises worn by Undercover Elephant tending to give him away (since some were ordered from the back of a comic book), Loudmouse blowing his cover when staking out the villain, Undercover Elephant being unable to avoid the exploding messages (a-la Mission Impossible) being sent to him by his Chief (voiced by Michael Bell), and to resist peanuts.

Episodes

Cast
 Lennie Weinrib as King, Yuka Yuka, Rattle, Park Ranger (in "Snowbound Safari"), Vampire (in "There's No Pest Like a Singing Guest")
 Sheldon Allman as Big H
 Ginny McSwain as Sheena
 Marvin Kaplan as Skids 
 Don Messick as Clyde, Seeker (in "Valley of No Return"), Elmo (in "The Carnival Caper"), Mr. Gridley (in "The Carnival Caper"), Newsman (in "Snowbound Safari"), Bigfoot/Robber (in "Snowbound Safari")
 Susan Silo as Zelda
 Daws Butler as Hustle, BlastasOff Buzzard, Duke, Stick, Undercover Elephant
 Henry Corden as Bump 
 Chuck McCann as Boogie, Blubber 
 Michael Bell as Chief
 Tommy Cook as
 Regis Cordic 
 Scatman Crothers as Segment Title Narrator
 Susan Davis as Charlie
 Cindy Erickson
 Bob Holt 
 Joan Gerber 
 Gay Hartwig 
 Bob Hastings as Loudmouse
 Joyce Mancini
 Julie McWhirter 
 Allan Melvin 
 Alan Oppenheimer as Sidney Merciless
 Patricia Parris 
 Joe E. Ross as Roll
 Ken Sansom 
 Hal Smith 
 John Stephenson as Abernathy (in "The Fright Farm"), Hunter Hunter (in "The Blue Kangaroo")
 Alex Tramunti
 Janet Waldo 
 Frank Welker as Carnival Worker (in "The Carnival Caper"), Ringmaster (in "The Carnival Caper")
 Paul Winchell as Shake
 Bill Woodson as Sheriff of Saddlesore

Home media
All thirteen episodes of Posse Impossible were released on VHS by Hanna-Barbera Home Video on November 25, 1988. In addition, three episodes of Shake, Rattle & Roll were released on VHS as part of a compilation titled Scooby-Doo & Friends: Mostly Ghostly by Hanna-Barbera Home Video in 1990, "The Ghostly Ghoul is a Ghastly Guest", "Spooking the Spooks" and "Guess What's Coming to Dinner".

Other appearances
 Undercover Elephant appeared in some episodes of Yogi's Treasure Hunt.
 Reruns of CB Bears and Undercover Elephant aired in the 1980s run of Captain Kangaroo.
 Reruns of Undercover Elephant were shown as one of the fillers for the adaption of Wake, Rattle, and Roll.
 Blast-Off Buzzard and Crazylegs appeared in an episode of Tom & Jerry Kids in which they actually talk with Crazylegs voiced by Charlie Adler.
 Undercover Elephant made a cameo in the "Agent Penny" episode of the Super Secret Secret Squirrel segment of 2 Stupid Dogs.
 CB Bears and The King and his classmates appeared in Jellystone! with King voiced by Bernardo de Paula. Skids and Big H are re-imagined as girls in this series. The King and his friends are depicted as criminals.

References

External links

 
 CB Bears at the Big Cartoon DataBase

1977 American television series debuts
1977 American television series endings
1970s American animated television series
1970s American anthology television series
1970s American mystery television series
American children's animated anthology television series
American children's animated comedy television series
American children's animated fantasy television series
American children's animated mystery television series
English-language television shows
NBC original programming
Television series by Hanna-Barbera
Hanna-Barbera characters
Animated television series about bears